Nelli Stepanyan is an Armenian football referee, a futsal player and a retired footballer. She has been a member of the Armenia women's national team.

Club career
Stepanyan started her football career in 1991 and played for «Kolej», a club which had quite high results at the time.

International career
Stepanyan capped for Armenia at senior level during the UEFA Women's Euro 2009 qualifying and in a friendly match against Croatia on 6 November 2007.

Referee career
After retiring from playing in 2011, Stepanyan became a FIFA referee, serving in both the Armenian Premier League and international matches. She made her international debut as a referee and a fourth official in 2011. She has mainly appeared in women's football matches, but she has also worked as a fourth official in men's Armenian Premier League.

See also
List of Armenia women's international footballers

References

Year of birth missing (living people)
Living people
Armenian women's footballers
Women's association footballers not categorized by position
Armenia women's international footballers

Women's association football referees
Women association football referees
Armenian women's futsal players